Anisolepis is a small genus of lizards in the family Leiosauridae. The genus is endemic to South America.

Species
Three species are known from South America.
Anisolepis grilli  – Boulenger's tree lizard
Anisolepis longicauda 
Anisolepis undulatus  –  Wiegmann's tree lizard

Nota bene: A binomial authority in parentheses indicates that the species was originally described in a genus other than Anisolepis.

Etymology
The specific name, grilli, is in honor of Italo-Brazilian physician Giuseppe Franco Grillo.

References

Further reading
Boulenger GA (1885). "Second List of Reptiles and Batrachians from the Province Rio Grande do Sul, Brazil, sent to the Natural-History Museum by Dr. H. von Ihering". Ann. Mag. Nat. Hist., Fifth Series 16: 85–88. (Anisolepis, new genus, pp. 85–86).

 
Endemic reptiles of South America
Taxa named by George Albert Boulenger